Slifer may refer to:
 Slifer the Sky Dragon, the English-language name of a card in the Yu-Gi-Oh! Trading Card Game
 Slifer House, house in Pennsylvania, United States

People with the surname
 Clarence Slifer (1912–1993), American special effects artist
 Roger Slifer (1954–2015), American comic book writer